Daily Times may refer to the following national newspapers:
 Daily Times (Nigeria), newspaper published in Nigeria
 Daily Times (Pakistan), newspaper published in Pakistan

The Daily Times may refer to the following newspapers:
 The Daily Times (Malawi), newspaper published in Malawi
 The Daily Times (Salisbury, Maryland), newspaper published in Salisbury, Maryland, USA
 The Daily Times (Pryor), newspaper published in Pryor, Oklahoma, USA
 The (Delaware County) Daily Times, newspaper published in Upper Darby Township, Delaware County, Pennsylvania, USA
The Daily Times (Blount County, Tennessee), newspaper published in Maryville, near Knoxville, USA
 The Daily Times, Beaver and Rochester, newspaper published in Pennsylvania, absorbed by The Beaver County Times

Other newspapers with titles containing Daily Times include:
 Otago Daily Times, newspaper published in Dunedin, New Zealand
 East Anglian Daily Times, newspaper published in Ipswich, East Anglia, UK
 Longmont Daily Times-Call, newspaper published in Longmont, Colorado, USA
 Pekin Daily Times, newspaper published in Pekin, Illinois, USA
 Davenport Daily Times, newspaper published in Davenport, Iowa, USA
 Glasgow Daily Times, newspaper published in Glasgow, Kentucky, USA
 Gloucester Daily Times, newspaper published in Gloucester, Massachusetts, USA
 Daily Times Chronicle (formerly the Woburn Daily Times), newspaper published in Woburn, Massachusetts, USA
 Crookston Daily Times, newspaper published in Crookston, Minnesota, USA
 Farmington Daily Times, newspaper published in Farmington, New Mexico, USA
 Watertown Daily Times, newspaper published in Watertown, New York, USA
 Portsmouth Daily Times, newspaper published in Portsmouth, Ohio, USA
 Centre Daily Times, newspaper published in State College, Pennsylvania, USA